Apple Podcasts (known as simply Podcasts in Apple operating systems) is an audio streaming service and media player application developed by Apple Inc. for playing podcasts. Apple began supporting podcasts with iTunes 4.9 released in June 2005 and launched its first standalone mobile app in 2012. The app was later pre-installed with iOS beginning October 2014. The Apple Podcasts directory features more than two million shows. Apple Podcasts is available on iOS, iPadOS, macOS, watchOS, tvOS, CarPlay, Microsoft Windows operating systems, and on Amazon Alexa devices.

History 
Apple was an early promoter of podcasts (the term is a portmanteau of Apple's iPod music player and "broadcast"), and added playback functionality to iTunes 4.9 released in June 2005 and built a directory of shows in its iTunes Music Store, starting with 3,000 entries. In April 2020, Apple Podcasts surpassed one million shows. In June 2021,  Apple launched the option for podcast creators to implement paid subscriptions through podcast channels.

Market share 
Apple Podcasts had an estimated 28 million U.S. monthly listeners and 23.8% market share in March 2021, the first month it fell behind Spotify Podcasts as the top podcasting platform in the U.S. This was a decrease from Apple's 34% market share in 2018.

Application platforms

iOS, tvOS, and watchOS versions
A standalone Apple Podcasts app was announced at the 2012 Worldwide Developers Conference as a feature of iOS 6. Apple released the app early on the App Store on June 26, 2012. It adds a new "stations" feature for discovering new podcasts. It is a standard app on CarPlay.

A standalone Apple Podcasts app was brought to 2nd and 3rd generation Apple TVs on September 24, 2012, with the Software 6.0 update. The tvOS-based 4th generation Apple TV launched in October 2015 without the ability to play podcasts. This was despite a Podcasts icon appearing on the home screen in commercials, in-store demo loops, and developer documentation. Apple Podcasts was added with tvOS 9.1.1 released on January 26, 2016.

Apple Podcasts was added to the Apple Watch with watchOS 5 on September 17, 2018.

macOS and Windows versions
Apple Podcasts for macOS and Microsoft Windows was initially available as part of the iTunes app, which added support for podcasts in version 4.9 in June 2005.

Apple announced at WWDC 2019 that iTunes for macOS would be split and replaced by the Music, TV and Podcasts apps with the release of macOS Catalina. Apple Podcasts remains available through iTunes on Microsoft Windows.

Smart speakers
Apple's HomePod family supports Podcasts using a voice user interface. Support for Apple Podcasts was added to the Amazon Echo line in December 2019.

Apple Podcasts Award

Reception
Critical reviews of the Apple Podcasts app have generally been mixed. In 2012, Engadget stated it "offers an opportunity to break through the clutter of iTunes". In 2017, Slate criticized it for glitches and low-quality audio. In 2019, Vulture called the app "a bummer" and "bare-bones and fairly clunky, even when it comes to basic functions like subscribing."

See also
List of podcast clients
Music (software)
Apple Music

References

Podcasting software
IOS software
WatchOS software
MacOS software
Apple Inc. software
IOS-based software made by Apple Inc.